Meşher is an art exhibition space on Istiklal Street in Istanbul, Turkey, operated by the private Vehbi Koç Foundation. Meşher was founded in 2019 in the building that formerly housed the Arter. The name Meşher is the Ottoman Turkish word meaning exhibition or exhibition space.

I-You-They: A Century of Artist Women (2021–2022)
The exhibition named I-You-They: A Century of Artist Women initially was held from 9 October 2021 to 27 March 2022 but was later extended another two months until 29 May 2022. It included pieces created by female artists who were based in Turkey and active between the years of the 1850s and the 1950s. It intends to recognize artists that are largely unrecognized in classic art history. 

The exhibition was curated by Deniz Artun, and was created under patronage by Çiğdem Simavi. The exhibition displayed more than 200 artworks by women artists, some of whose names have been forgotten and others who are well-known. Most of the works had never been part of an exhibition before. According to co-curator of the exhibition Ebru Esra Satıcı "one of the objectives of this exhibition is to point out these...hidden treasures to researchers, art historians or scholars who are specialising on women's studies to conduct more research on these names and come up with new finds". The exhibition was split into three floors with their own themes; I, You and They. The first floor, I, focuses on the artists' theme of self-perception, reflections, or other forms of self-discovery and includes among others self-portrait photographs and other artworks. The second floor, You, is about motherhood among other themes, it is about the close environment of the artist, children or parents and displays artworks within that theme. The third floor, They, shows artworks around the theme of how society sees women including artworks that society expects women to paint featuring more domestic topics including flowers, children, food and plants.

List of exhibitions
2019 – Beyond the Vessel, Myths, Legends, and Fables in Contemporary Ceramics around Europe, (September 13 – December 22)
2020 – Alexis Gritchenko – The Constantinople Years, (7 February – 1 November)
2021/2022 – I-You-They: A Century of Artist Women, (October 9, 2021 – May 29, 2022)

Notes

References

2019 establishments in Turkey
Arts organizations established in 2019
Arts organizations based in Turkey
Art museums and galleries in Istanbul